Derudaf Forever is a live album by Danish rock band Gasolin', released 15 years after it was recorded.

The success of the Rabalderstræde Forever compilation in 1991 was followed by this live album in 1993. It was Gasolin's third live album, the other two are Live Sådan and Live i Skandinavien. Derudaf Forever contains 18 songs recorded by Sweet Silence Mobile Studio in 1976 and 1978.

It was released as a double LP and single CD and was produced by Franz Beckerlee. It was engineered by Freddy Hansson, Flemming Rasmussen and Tom West and mixed by Franz Beckerlee and Flemming Hansson in 1992. In 1999 Derudaf Forever was released as Gasolin' Forever as a part of a 2CD compilation with Rabalderstræde Forever.

Track listing 

 "Kina Rock"
Tivoli 19 February 1978
 "Nanna"
Holstebro 24 January 1976
 "Smukke Linda"
Holstebro 24 January 1976
 "Det Bedste til Mig og Mine Venner"
Oslo 10 August 1978
 "Get on the Train"
Greve 13 February 1978
 "Hvad Gør Vi Nu, Lille Du"
Oslo 10 August 1978
 "1975"
Holstebro 24 January 1976
 "Pas på Svinget i Solrød"
Helsingborg 20 August 1978
 "På Banen (Derudaf)"
Holstebro 24 January 1976
 "Jumbo Nummer Nul"
Greve 13 February 1978
 "December i New York"
Tivoli 19 February 1978
 "Kattemor"
Oslo 10 August 1978
 "Kloden Drejer Stille Rundt"
Oslo 10 August 1978
 "Fi-Fi-Dong"
Tivoli 19 February 1978
 "Strengelegen"
Helsingborg 20 August 1978
 "Girl You Got Me Lonely"
Tivoli 19 February 1978
 "Refrainet er Frit"
Tivoli 19 February 1978
 "Som et Strejf af en Dråbe"
Tivoli 19 February 1978

Credits

Gasolin'

Søren "Charlie" Berlev - Vocals and drums
Kim Larsen - vocals and guitar
Franz Beckerlee - Vocals and lead guitar
Wili Jønsson - Vocals, piano and bass
Recorded in Sweet Silence Mobile Studio summer/vinter 1976/78
Recorded by Freddy Hansson, Flemming "Flim-Flam" Rasmussen and Tom West
Mixed in Sweet Silence Mobile Studios October - December 1992
Mixed by Flemming "Junior" Hansson and Franz Beckerlee
Mastering by Lene Reidel

References

Gasolin' albums
1993 live albums
Columbia Records live albums